Amination is the process by which an amine group is introduced into an organic molecule. This type of reaction is important because organonitrogen compounds are pervasive.

Reactions

Aminase enzymes
Enzymes that catalyse this reaction are termed aminases. Amination can occur in a number of ways including reaction with ammonia or another amine such as an alkylation, reductive amination and the Mannich reaction.

Acid-catatlyzed hydroamination
Many alkyl amines are produced industrially by the amination of alcohols using ammonia in the presence of solid acid catalysts.  Illustrative is the production of tert-butylamine:
NH3  +  CH2=C(CH3)2  →   H2NC(CH3)3
The Ritter reaction of isobutene with hydrogen cyanide is not useful in this case because it produces too much waste.

Electrophilic amination 
Usually, the amine reacts as the nucleophile with another organic compound acting as the electrophile. This sense of reactivity may be reversed for some electron-deficient amines, including oxaziridines, hydroxylamines, oximes, and other N–O substrates. When the amine is used as an electrophile, the reaction is called electrophilic amination. Electron-rich organic substrates that may be used as nucleophiles for this process include carbanions and enolates.

Miscellaneous methods
Alpha hydroxy acids can be converted into amino acids directly using aqueous ammonia solution, hydrogen gas and a heterogeneous metallic ruthenium catalyst.

Metal-catalyzed hydroamination
In hydroamination, amines add to alkenes.

See also
Alkylation, the addition of an alkyl group
Acylation, the addition of an acyl group (-C(O)R)
Deamination

References

Organic reactions